"A Must to Avoid" is a song written by P.F. Sloan and Steve Barri and performed by Herman's Hermits.  It was featured on their 1966 album, Hold On! and on their 1966 EP, A Must to Avoid.  The song was produced by Mickie Most.

Background
Billboard said of the single: "The group has a winning and swinging rocker with hit written all over it."  Cash Box described it as a "rhythmic, twangy item about an unusual gal who means poison to any guy."

Chart performance
"A Must to Avoid" reached #1 in New Zealand, #3 in Canada, #4 in Australia, #5 in Norway, #6 on the UK's Record Retailer chart, and #8 on the Billboard Hot 100 in 1965.

Influences
This song was reworked by the Swedish band The Shanes as Chris-Craft No. 9.

References

1965 songs
1965 singles
Songs written by P. F. Sloan
Songs written by Steve Barri
Herman's Hermits songs
Song recordings produced by Mickie Most
Number-one singles in New Zealand
MGM Records singles